Yue Man Square is the town centre of Kwun Tong in Kowloon of Hong Kong. It is also the commercial centre in the area.

History
Located in the town centre, in late 1950s and early 1960s, the street attracted shops of various trades, including banking, jewellery, fashion, grocery and cinema. Restaurants offered different schools of Chinese cuisines.

Redevelopment 
The Hong Kong Government had plans to redevelop the town centre. Concens were raised as many completed projects had destroyed the traditional communities, culture and heritage.  The redevelopment, which opened alongside a new bus interchange, opened in April 2021.

Education
Yue Man Square is in the Primary One Admission (POA) School Net 48. Within the school net are multiple aided schools (operated independently but funded with government money) as well as the Kwun Tong Government Primary School.

References

External links

Google Maps of Yue Man Square

Squares in Hong Kong
Roads in New Kowloon
Kwun Tong